Saint-Honoré-de-Shenley is a municipality in the Beauce-Sartigan Regional County Municipality in the Chaudière-Appalaches region of Quebec, Canada. Its population is 1,555 as of 2021.

The municipality was created in 2000 after the merging of the parish municipality of Saint-Honoré and the township municipality of Shenley. It is named after Honoré Desruisseaux, the first reverend of the parish in 1869, and the village of Shenley, Hertfordshire, England.

References

Municipalities in Quebec
Incorporated places in Chaudière-Appalaches